Anthony Cattell Trischka (born January 16, 1949) is an American five-string banjo player. Sandra Brennan wrote of him in 2021: "One of the most influential modern banjoists, both in several forms of bluegrass music and occasionally in jazz and avant-garde, Tony Trischka has inspired a whole generation of progressive bluegrass musicians."

Music career

A native of Syracuse, New York, Trischka's interest in banjo was sparked by the Kingston Trio's version of "Charlie and the MTA" in 1963. Two years later, he joined the Down City Ramblers, where he remained through 1971. That year, he made his recording debut on 15 Bluegrass Instrumentals with the band Country Cooking; at the same time, he was also a member of America's premier sports-rock band Country Granola. In 1973, he began a three-year stint with Breakfast Special. Between 1974 and 1975, he recorded two solo albums, Bluegrass Light and Heartlands. After one more solo album in 1976, Banjoland, he went on to become musical leader for the Broadway show The Robber Bridegroom. Trischka toured with the show in 1978, the year he also played with the Monroe Doctrine.

In 1978, Trischka toured Japan and recorded with Peter Rowan and Richard Greene. In the early 1980s, he began recording with his group Skyline, which released its first album in 1983. Later albums included Robot Plane Flies over Arkansas (solo, 1983), Stranded in the Moonlight (with Skyline, 1984) and Hill Country (solo, 1985). In 1984, he performed in his first feature film, Foxfire. Three years later, he worked on the pre-recorded music for the off-Broadway production of Driving Miss Daisy that featured Jessica Tandy and Morgan Freeman. Trischka produced the Belgian group Gold Rush's No More Angels in 1988. The following year, Skyline recorded its final album, Fire of Grace. He also recorded the theme song for Books on the Air, a popular National Public Radio show, and continued his affiliation with the network by appearing on Garrison Keillor's Prairie Home Companion, Mountain Stage, From Our Front Porch, and other radio shows. Trischka continued his recording career with 1993's World Turning, 1995's Glory Shone Around: A Christmas Collection and 1999's Bend. New Deal followed in 2003.

Double Banjo Bluegrass Spectacular, featuring appearances by Steve Martin, Earl Scruggs, Béla Fleck and Tony Rice, came out four years later. For this recording Trischka went back to bluegrass and reinvigorated the double banjo tradition. In October 2007, he was given an IBMA (International Bluegrass Music Association) award for Banjo Player of the Year 2007. Double Banjo Bluegrass Spectacular received IBMA awards for Recorded Event of the Year, Instrumental Album of the Year and a Grammy Nomination.

He has written over fifteen instructional books and a series of DVDs. In July 2009 he launched the groundbreaking Online Banjo School with Tony Trischka, an interactive, online learning school that teaches students around the world how to play banjo with ArtistWorks. Trischka is closely associated with "newgrass," which features several innovations to traditional bluegrass, including jazzy arrangements, non-traditional chordal structures, and frequent covers of non-bluegrass songs. Trischka is one of the major innovators of the "chromatic" banjo style, which features sinewy, snaky melodic runs not strictly played out of chord positions.

2011 saw Give Me the Banjo aired on PBS stations nationwide with Trischka as the musical director and co-producer of the documentary. It was released on DVD. He produced Steve Martin's Grammy-nominated Rare Bird Alert (Rounder), which features performances by Paul McCartney, the Dixie Chicks and the Steep Canyon Rangers.

In December 2012, Trischka was awarded the United States Artists Friends Fellow in recognition of the excellence of his work.

Discography

As leader
 Bluegrass Light (Rounder, 1974)
 Heartlands (Rounder, 1975)
 Banjoland (Rounder, 1977)
 Fiddle Tunes for Banjo with Bill Keith and Béla Fleck (Rounder, 1981)
 A Robot Plane Flies over Arkansas (Rounder, 1983)
 Hill Country (Rounder, 1985)
 Alone & Together with Beppe Gambetta (Brambus, 1991)
 Solo Banjo Works with Béla Fleck (Rounder, 1992)
 World Turning (Rounder, 1995)
 Glory Shone Around: A Christmas Collection (Rounder, 1995)
 Double Banjo Bluegrass Spectacular (Rounder, 2007)
 Territory (Smithsonian Folkways 2008)
 Great Big World (Rounder, 2014)
Of A Winter's Night (Independent, 2014)
The Durban Sessions (Independent, 2019)
 Shall We Hope (Shefa Records, 2021)

With the Big Dogs
 Live at the Birchmere (Strictly Country, 1993)

With Psychograss
 Psychograss (Windham Hill, 1993)
 Like Minds (Sugar Hil, 1996)
 Now Hear This (Adventure Music America, 2005)

With Skyline
 Late to Work (Flying Fish, 1981)
 Stranded in the Moonlight (Flying Fish, 1984)
 Skyline Drive (Flying Fish, 1986)
 Fire of Grace (Flying Fish, 1989)

With the Wayfaring Strangers
 Shifting Sands of Time (Rounder, 2001)
 This Train (Rounder, 2003)

Television appearances
 Merv Griffin Show, 1976
 Nashville Network's Fire on the Mountain, 1984, 1986
 Ralph Emery's "Frets" Awards Show, The Nashville Network, 1987
 CBS Hallmark Hall of Fame production of Foxfire with Jessica Tandy, Hume Cronyn and John Denver, 1987
 British television production of Echoes of America: History of the Five String Banjo, 1989
 Where in the World is Carmen Sandiego? (PBS), 1992
 CBS Sunday Morning with Charles Osgood – feature story (including Béla Fleck), 1995
 ABC World News Tonight with Peter Jennings, Summer, 1996
 ABC Views, with Béla Fleck, Summer 1997
 Live at the Quick, with Bela Fleck, 2004–2006
 The Ellen DeGeneres Show, with Steve Martin, Brittany Haas, and Michael Daves, April 2007
 Late Show with David Letterman, with Steve Martin, Bela Fleck, Brittany Haas, and Michael Daves, April 2007
 CBS Television Network's Elton John: I'm Still Standing - A Grammy Salute, with Miley Cyrus, April 2018

Bibliography
 Melodic Banjo, Oak Publications, 1976
 Banjo Song Book, Oak Publications, 1977
 Masters of the 5-String Banjo, Oak Publications, 1988

References

External links
 Official site
 Online Banjo School with Tony Trischka

American banjoists
American country banjoists
American bluegrass musicians
1949 births
Living people
Nottingham High School (Syracuse, New York) alumni
Musicians from Syracuse, New York
Independent Music Awards winners
Country musicians from New York (state)
Psychograss members
Rounder Records artists
Flying Fish Records artists
Brambus Records artists